Jeff Strasser (born 5 October 1974) is a Luxembourgish former professional football player and the current manager of Progrès Niederkorn.

Club career
As one of the rare successful professional footballers from Luxembourg, Strasser has made a fairly successful career in French and German first divisions. After playing for French side FC Metz in Ligue 1 between 1993 and 1999, he moved to German Bundesliga side 1. FC Kaiserslautern and spent three seasons with the club before leaving it for Borussia Mönchengladbach in 2002. With the two German clubs, he spent seven seasons in Bundesliga and was a regular in each of the seven seasons, making a total of 194 appearances and scoring 10 goals in the league.

In August 2006, he moved to French Ligue 2 side RC Strasbourg. On 31 July 2007, he signed a two-year contract with FC Metz and was released after his contract ended on 30 June 2009, On 17 July 2009, he returned to Luxembourg on 17 July 2009, signing a two-year contract with CS Fola Esch. However, the move only lasted 17 days before Strasser moved to Grasshopper, signing a one-year contract on 15 August 2009.

International career
Strasser made his debut for Luxembourg in an October 1993 World Cup qualification match against Greece. As of December 2008, he had earned a record 88 caps, scoring six goals. He played in 29 FIFA World Cup qualification matches. He has been Luxembourg's all-time record cap-holder, since taking over from Carlo Weis in November 2008.

Managerial career
On 17 May 2010, he was appointed as youth manager of CS Fola Esch. On 4 December 2010, he was promoted to the Fola Esch senior team, managing briefly in November 2010 along with Cyril Serredszum, who later took on the job alone. Strasser took the job permanently himself in 2012, taking Fola Esch to their first wins in the UEFA Europa League before leaving in 2017 to take over 1. FC Kaiserslautern.

On 24 January 2018, in a game against SV Darmstadt 98, Strasser was rushed to hospital after suffering a medical emergency at half-time. Reports in German media claimed that Strasser had suffered a heart attack and the game was immediately abandoned. A week later, it was announced that due to ongoing health problems, Strasser will no longer be active as manager for 1. FC Kaiserslautern.

On 16 August 2018, it was announced that Strasser had returned to manage Fola Esch.

Career statistics

International goals
Source:

Managerial statistics 
As of 19 March 2023.

References

External links

1974 births
Living people
Sportspeople from Luxembourg City
Luxembourgian footballers
Luxembourgian expatriate footballers
FC Metz players
1. FC Kaiserslautern players
Borussia Mönchengladbach players
RC Strasbourg Alsace players
CS Fola Esch players
Grasshopper Club Zürich players
Ligue 1 players
Bundesliga players
Ligue 2 players
Swiss Super League players
Expatriate footballers in France
Expatriate footballers in Germany
Expatriate footballers in Switzerland
Luxembourgian expatriate sportspeople in France
Luxembourgian expatriate sportspeople in Germany
Luxembourgian expatriate sportspeople in Switzerland
Luxembourg international footballers
Luxembourgian football managers
CS Fola Esch managers
Association football defenders
1. FC Kaiserslautern managers
2. Bundesliga managers